Tormod Kjellsen (25 September 1894 – 27 May 1978) was a Norwegian footballer from Larvik. He played for his local club Larvik Turn.

He made his debut for the Norway national football team on 11 September 1910 in a 4–0 defeat to Sweden in Kristiania (now Oslo). Kjellsen was the only player in the Norwegian squad to be at a team from outside the capital. His only other international cap was on 14 September 1913 in a 1–1 friendly draw against Russia in Moscow.

Kjellsen was aged 15 years  and 351 days on his international debut. He held the record as the youngest full Norwegian international for over a century until it was broken by Martin Ødegaard on 27 August 2014.

References

1894 births
1978 deaths
People from Larvik
Larvik Turn players
Norwegian footballers
Norway international footballers
Association footballers not categorized by position
Sportspeople from Vestfold og Telemark